Emeigh is an unincorporated community in Cambria County, Pennsylvania, United States. Emeigh has a post office with ZIP code 15738, which opened on June 15, 1905.

Notable people
Duffy Daugherty, American football coach
Boyd Wagner, WWII Ace

References

Unincorporated communities in Cambria County, Pennsylvania
Unincorporated communities in Pennsylvania